Four Corners, also known as Citrus Ridge, is an unincorporated suburban community and census-designated place (CDP) in the U.S. state of Florida, located near the borders of Lake, Orange, Osceola, and Polk counties. Its population was 56,381 at the 2020 census, up from 26,116 at the 2010 census.

The Lake, Orange, and Osceola County portions of Four Corners are part of the Orlando–Kissimmee–Sanford, Florida Metropolitan Statistical Area, while the Polk County portion is part of the Lakeland–Winter Haven Metropolitan Statistical Area.

Geography
Four Corners is located at the four-way intersection of the Lake, Orange, Osceola, and Polk County borders near the center of the CDP. Neighboring communities are Horizon West and Bay Lake to the northeast, Celebration to the east, and Loughman to the southeast.

The Census-drawn boundaries for the area include Interstate 4 along part of the southern border and U.S. Route 27 along part of the western border. The Western Beltway (Florida State Road 429) travels through the eastern portion of the CDP. Areas outside the CDP that are sometimes considered part of Four Corners include north along US 27 to Lake Louisa State Park (4 miles north of US 192), south along US 27 to Heart of Florida Hospital (3 miles south of I-4), west to SR 33, and east to Walt Disney World Resort and Celebration. Four Corners is the only community in Florida to be located in four counties.

Splendid China was a theme park in Four Corners. It opened in 1993, closed on December 31, 2003, and sat abandoned for 10 years after that. Splendid China Florida cost $100 million to build. It was a  miniature park with more than 60 replicas at one-tenth scale. Margaritaville Resort opened on the former Splendid China site, with resort homes, condos and timeshares in a Jimmy Buffett-themed setting. In the summer of 2019, the Sunset Walk restaurants and shops opened next to the Margaritaville Resort. Radio Margaritaville broadcasts from the Margaritaville Resort.

Demographics

As of the 2020 United States census, there were 56,381 people, 15,955 households, and 10,559 families residing in the CDP.

As of the census of 2010, there were 26,116 people, 9,904 households, and 6,976 families residing in the CDP. There were 26,531 housing units, of which 16,627, or 62.7%, were vacant. 13,499 of the vacant units were for seasonal or recreational use. The racial makeup of the CDP was 76.1% White, 8.0% African American, 0.5% Native American, 2.5% Asian, 0.1% Pacific Islander, 9.2% some other race, and 3.5% from two or more races. Hispanic or Latino of any race were 30.1% of the population.

Of the 9,904 households, 33.6% had children under the age of 18 living with them, 52.0% were headed by married couples living together, 13.3% had a female householder with no husband present, and 29.6% were non-families. 21.0% of all households were made up of individuals, and 4.9% were someone living alone who was 65 years of age or older. The average household size was 2.64, and the average family size was 3.05.

23.7% of the CDP population were under the age of 18, 8.6% were from 18 to 24, 30.1% were from 25 to 44, 25.0% were from 45 to 64, and 12.7% were age 65 or older. The median age was 36.7 years. For every 100 females, there were 94.6 males. For every 100 females age 18 and over, there were 91.8 males.

For the period 2013-17, the estimated median annual income for a household in the CDP was $53,750, and the median income for a family was $57,173. Male full-time workers had a median income of $36,079 versus $30,070 for females. The per capita income for the CDP was $23,653. About 12.8% of families and 15.9% of the population were below the poverty line, including 27.4% of those under age 18 and 6.7% of those age 65 or over.

Government and infrastructure

Osceola County Fire Rescue operates Station 71 in Four Corners. Polk County Fire Rescue operates Station 42 (on U.S. 27 just south of U.S.192) and 33 (on Ronald Reagan Blvd just east of U.S. 27) in Four Corners. Lake County Fire Rescue operates Station 112 in Four Corners. Orange County Fire Rescue operates Station 32 in Four Corners.

Education
The CDP is served by four different school districts:
 Lake County Schools
 Polk County Public Schools
 School District of Osceola County, Florida
 Orange County Public Schools
Residents of that section are zoned to: Keene's Crossing Elementary School, Bridgewater Middle School, and starting in 2017, Windermere High School. Residents were previously assigned to West Orange High School.

Transportation
The Four Corners area is served by U.S. Routes 27 and 192, which intersect one mile west of the quadripoint.

The area is served by two Lynx bus routes, which terminate at Legacy Boulevard on US 192.  Link 55 travels east on US 192, and link 427 travels south on US 27.

References

Census-designated places in Orange County, Florida
Census-designated places in Osceola County, Florida
Census-designated places in Polk County, Florida
Census-designated places in Lake County, Florida
Cities in the Greater Orlando
Census-designated places in Florida
Quadripoints and higher